is a Japanese manga series written and illustrated by Fujihiko Hosono. It was firstly serialized in Shogakukan's seinen manga magazine Weekly Big Comic Spirits from 1992 to 2005, with its chapters collected in thirty-two tankōbon volumes. A thirty-seven episode anime television series adaptation was broadcast on TV Tokyo in 2005. A two-chapter story and a four-chapter story were published in Weekly Big Comic Spirits in 2012 and 2016, respectively. A new serialization of Gallery Fake began in Big Comic Zōkan in 2017.

In 1996, Gallery Fake received the 41st Shogakukan Manga Award for the general category.

Plot
On a wharf on Tokyo Bay is a small gallery named Gallery Fake. The owner of the gallery, was once a curator at the Metropolitan Museum of Art in New York. He was a learned curator with remarkable memory, keen aesthetic sense, great skill in restoration of paintings and knowledge of many languages, so he was called the "Professor". However, because of trouble in the workplace, Fujita was forced to quit the museum. Now he is an art dealer who sells paintings, authentic and fake alike, sometimes at extraordinary prices, depending on the circumstances or the type of buyer. His motto is "One without aesthetic sense can't help being cheated out of his money. And by being deceived, one may learn to distinguish real ones from the counterfeit."

However, Fujita has a strong sense of justice. He truly appreciates art and the artists who spent their lives to create it and does not try to deceive people by passing off fake paintings as genuine ones. He will go out of his way to help people in trouble, but also bring justice to politicians, businessmen or art dealers who are dishonest. He often touches the lives of those he encounters and people are attracted to him in spite of his sometimes gruff manner.

Characters

He is an art dealer and a former curator for the  Metropolitan Museum of Art (MET). Those he worked with refer to him as "Professor Fujita". He was forced to leave the MET by Max Watson when Fujita threatened to exposes his shady dealings. Later, he established his own gallery on a wharf in Tokyo, Japan called Gallery Fake. He is an expert at painting restoration and an artist. He can usually determine if a painting is real or fake. He sometimes makes promises he cannot keep (mostly to Sara) and will sometimes deal on the black market to get certain artifacts. Fujita hates exercise and is easily exhausted from physical activity. Fujita is often the cause of Sara's anger although he very protective of her. He has a daughter from a previous relationship, named Elizabeth, his love child with Flora Joconda (a descendant of Mona Lisa). The two met when Fujita was a penniless young man and not yet an employee of the MET.

She is Fujita's assistant and is very loyal, defending him if he is criticized. She accompanies Fujita on trips although she has little knowledge of art. She has a crush on him and is jealous if he visits Fei Cui. She adopts a stray cat which she has used to attack. She is an optimistic person and has a somewhat childish personality though she is persistent and unforgiving at times. Sara is a member of Kerabia's royal family and hates war because it resulted in the death of  her family.

She is the director at Takada Art Museum. She thinks of Fujita as someone who is not helping the art world but destroying it. She states that Fujita is a cold-blooded scam artist. She is a stiff confident person and workaholic. She harbors some feelings for Fujita, as shown in episode 12.

She owns a store called Jade, but is also a proclaimed jewel thief. She is obsessed with them and other precious items. She often calls Fujita to gloat about her latest stolen items. Sara sees her as a rival for Fujita's attention. She has a volatile personality and her manservant, Menou, has said that Fei can be sunny one day and stormy the next. She sometimes has a problem with her eyes and fears she may go blind. Fujita claims that the jewels affect her eyes.

Fei Cui's middle-aged manservant who is also a masochist. He is happy when Fei Cui punishes him for misdemeanors.

He is an associate of Fujita and helps him with his activities.

 He is an addicted treasure hunter and sometimes joins Fujita when his particular skills are required.
Max Watson
He is an art expert and employee of the Metropolitan Museum of Art (MET). He caused Fujita Reiji to resign from the MET after Fujita accused him of re-attributing paintings which were then sold a reduced price to the art dealer Bill Travers.

Media

Manga
Gallery Fake is written and illustrated by Fujihiko Hosono. The series ran in Shogakukan's Weekly Big Comic Spirits from 1992 to 2005. Its chapters were collected in thirty-two tankōbon volumes, released from August 29, 1992, to April 26, 2005. Hosono published a two-chapter story in 2012 as part of the "Heroes Come Back" anthology, which comprised short stories by manga artists to raise funds for recovery of the areas afflicted by the 2011 Tōhoku earthquake and tsunami. In 2016, a short-term serialization story was published in Weekly Big Comic Spirits from May to June, followed by a one-shot chapter published in Monthly Big Comic Spirits in August. A collected 33rd volume was released on November 30, 2016. Volume 34 was published on September 28, 2018. As of February 28, 2022, thirty-six volumes have been released.

Volume list

Anime

Episode list

Reception
In 1996, Gallery Fake received the 41st Shogakukan Manga Award for the general category.

Notes

References

External links
  
 

1992 manga
Aniplex
Art in anime and manga
Seinen manga
Shogakukan manga
TMS Entertainment
TV Tokyo original programming
Winners of the Shogakukan Manga Award for general manga
Works by Fujihiko Hosono